Killiyur may refer to:

Killiyur, Tiruvarur
Killiyur, Kanniyakumari
Killiyur (State Assembly Constituency)